Monsieur Samatam Krishnayya (Samatam Kistaya) (Yanam c. 1875 – 13 June 1954) was a poet, historian and ayurvedic doctor. He wrote many books in Telugu. He was a loyal pro-French politician.

Life

During 1954, Monsieur Maddimsetti fled from Yanam to join pro-merger group, which brought anger in its people that led to pillage of his home. Then a 78-year-old, Monsieur Samatam Krouschnaya became the Mayor of Yanam (interim) who was the lone pro-French leader to fight against pro-merger leaders.

Death
He died during the Coup d'État de Yanaon on Sunday, 13 June 1954 at the age of 78 years. It was declared that he was killed by Indian Military while seizing Yanam. But it is still a mystery about the actual causes and real persons behind his death.

Major view about his death
On the day of the coup, he fought a lone battle to maintain French sovereignty in Yanam against all the pro-merger groups. When he was trying to jump from a wall (at Pydikondala house) and take shelter, he was shot by Maddimchetty Satianandam who had a pistol which had been given to him by one of his close friends. It was known that Maddimchetty thought that because of Monsieur Samatam that only his house had been pillaged. The 78-year-old, Acting Mayor Monsieur Samatam collapsed mortally wounded, but even as he was dying he did not stop shouting Vive la France. It was declared that Monsieur Samatam was killed by shots fired by the Indian Military which brought tears to many people in Yanam. The death of Monsieur Samatam is still considered by the French even now as a political conspiracy perpetrated by the Indian side. For locals of Yanam, it is still a mystery, who was the real murderer of their beloved leader.

A popular view is that it was only personal interests that drove the leaders to help in the merger of Yanam rather than that of the cause of Indian nationalism.

French patriot
The French Government identified him as a patriot of France with Citation à l’Ordre de la Nation on 19 November 1954.

Titles held

See also
Yanam, French India
Dadala Rafael Ramanayya
Diwan Bouloussou Soubramaniam Sastroulou
Kamichetty Sri Parassourama Varaprassada Rao Naidu

References

People from Yanam
French India
Krouschnaya, Samatam
1870s births
1954 deaths
Mayors of Yanam
French people of Telugu descent